The Senedd and Elections (Wales) Act 2020 (anaw 1) is an Act of the National Assembly for Wales that was given royal assent on 15 January 2020. It was first detailed in February 2019 by way of an Explanatory Memorandum.

Summary

The Act allowed for the first time in Wales afford 16 and 17 year olds the right to vote, beginning with the  2021 Senedd election. The decision is the largest franchise extension in Wales since 1969, when the Representation of the People Act 1969 reduced the voting age from 21 to 18. The franchise will also be extended to "eligible foreign nationals".

The Act also changed the name of the legislature to "Senedd Cymru" or "the Welsh Parliament". The decision was controversial and saw much debate in the Chamber between those who favoured the single name Senedd and those (led by former First Minister Carwyn Jones) who sought to include a bilingual element. Guidance issued following the passage of the Act suggests that the institution is to be commonly known as the 'Senedd' in both English and Welsh.

The Act amended the Government of Wales Act 2006 (s. 16) so that some disqualified individuals prohibited from taking up a seat in the Senedd are, and some are not, also prohibited from standing for election; and ensures that the Electoral Commission is funded by and accountable to the Senedd for Welsh elections.

The Bill was agreed by the Assembly on 27 November 2019. It became an Act following Royal Assent on 15 January 2020. The contents of the act were implemented in May 2020.

References

External links 

 Senedd and Elections (Wales) Bill 2019 as passed

Constitutional laws of Wales
Acts of the National Assembly for Wales
Electoral reform in Wales
2020 in Wales
2020 in British law
2020 in British politics